In planning, the evening economy describes economic activity taking place in the evening after many people finish daytime employment or formal education, such as eating and drinking, entertainment, and nightlife (which may be described by the related term nighttime economy).

Activities
The evening economy includes, but is not limited to:
Eating out - restaurants, cafes, takeaways
Drinking - pubs and bars
Culture and entertainment - theatres, cinemas, live music and comedy events, ten pin bowling, ice skating
Sport - spectator sports including football, rugby and greyhound racing often take place in the evening, especially during Mondays to Fridays.
Healthcare, police and firefighting

Benefits and drawbacks
The benefits of a significant evening economy can include:
Recreation for people, which is often welcome after finishing work for the day
Increased employment due to local spending
Reduced social exclusion and increased vitality in towns

The drawbacks can include:
Noise pollution
Crime and/or anti-social behaviour, particularly where alcohol is involved
Traffic congestion

Regeneration
Evening economic activity has been used to drive urban regeneration in cities such as Manchester, Newcastle upon Tyne and Dublin.

References

Economies
Nightlife